Guo Puxiao (born January 1964) is a general (Shangjiang) of the People's Liberation Army (PLA) of China and the political commissar of the People's Liberation Army Air Force (PLAAF) since January 2022. He previously served as the political commissar of Logistic Support Department of the Central Military Commission from 2019 to 2022.

Biography
Guo was born in Yao County, Shaanxi, in January 1964 and entered into service in the PLA in 1981. He served in the PLA Air Force for a long time. In 2014 he became political commissar of the People's Liberation Army Air Force Airborne Corps. In 2017, he succeeded Liu Shaoliang as deputy political commissar of the Central Theater Command and political commissar of the Central Theater Command Air Force. In December 2019, he was appointed political commissar of the CMC Logistic Support Department, replacing Zhang Guoshu.

He was promoted to the rank of lieutenant general (zhongjiang) in July 2018 and general (Shangjiang) in December 2020.

References

1964 births
Living people
People from Tongchuan
People's Liberation Army generals from Shaanxi
People's Liberation Army Air Force generals
Delegates to the 13th National People's Congress
Members of the 20th Central Committee of the Chinese Communist Party